Charles Dowson (16 November 1889 – 5 February 1980) was a British racewalker. He competed in the 3 km walk and the 10 km walk events at the 1920 Summer Olympics.

References

1889 births
1980 deaths
British male racewalkers
Olympic athletes of Great Britain
Athletes (track and field) at the 1920 Summer Olympics